Sisson's Peony Gardens is located in Rosendale, Wisconsin. The site was added to the National Register of Historic Places in 2006.

History
Wilbur Sisson began growing peony plants in his sister's yard after his retirement in 1918. Sisson found success in selling the plants and expanded the gardens. In 2005, the Rosendale Historical Society purchased the site.

Images

References

Parks on the National Register of Historic Places in Wisconsin
Gardens in Wisconsin
Geography of Fond du Lac County, Wisconsin
National Register of Historic Places in Fond du Lac County, Wisconsin